A4 most often refers to:
A4 paper, a paper size defined by the ISO 216 standard, measuring 210 × 297 mm

A4 and variants may also refer to:

Science and mathematics 
 British NVC community A4 (Hydrocharis morsus-ranae - Stratiotes aloides community),  one type of Aquatic communities in the British National Vegetation Classification system
 Combretastatin A-4, a stilbenoid chemical compound
 A4, the alternating group on four elements
 A4, a type of stainless steel, as defined by ISO 3506, equivalent to SAE steel grade 316L
 Subfamily A4, a rhodopsin-like receptors subfamily

Medicine 
 ATC code A04 Antiemetics and antinauseants, a subgroup of the Anatomical Therapeutic Chemical Classification System
 Lipoxin A4, a lipoxin
 Androstenedione, an androgen steroid hormone

Transportation

Aeronautics and astronautics 
 "A-4 Helldiver", the civil version of the Curtiss Falcon an attack aircraft manufactured by Curtiss Aircraft Company
 Douglas A-4 Skyhawk, a 1954 attack aircraft manufactured by Douglas Aircraft Company
 Breda A.4, a 1926 Italian biplane trainer aircraft
 Aggregat-4, the technical name for V-2 ballistic missile
 A4, Southern Winds Airlines, the defunct Argentine airline, as its IATA code
 A4, Azimuth (airline), as its current IATA code
 A-004, the sixth and final abort test of the Apollo spacecraft
 S.A-4 or A.4, 1915 French reconnaissance fighter built by SPAD

Railways 
 Bavarian A IV, an 1852 German steam locomotive model
 LNER Class A4, a class of steam locomotives, including the famous Mallard
 PRR A4, an American Pennsylvania Railroad locomotive classification
 Togoshi Station, number A-04 on the Toei Asakusa Line

Ships 
 A-4, a Plunger-class submarine of the United States Navy, which was renamed A-4 on 17 November 1911
 , a 1978 Royal New Zealand Navy Moa-class inshore patrol vessel
 , an A-class submarine of the Royal Navy
 , a Belgian naval patrol vessel of World War II

Other vehicles 
 Audi A4, a luxury compact executive car manufactured by Audi, introduced in 1994
 Arrows A4, a 1982 British racing car
 Prussian A 4, a 1913 German railbus

Roads and routes 
 List of A4 roads
 A4, a Metrobus route in Washington, D.C.

Military 
 A4, the model number of the World War II-era German V-2 rocket
 A4, the designation for air force headquarters in the NATO continental staff system concerned with logistics
 In the United Kingdom, the A4 Air Logistics branch of the Joint Force Air Component Headquarters
 A 4, see List of Swedish regiments for A4, a Swedish designation (4th Artillery Regiment) that has been used by:
 Gotlands artilleriregemente (unknown–1892)
 Norrlands artilleriregemente (1893–1997)
 Douglas A-4 Skyhawk, an American attack aircraft introduced in 1956
 M16A4, a variant of the American M16 rifle
 Leopard 1A4, a variant of the German Leopard 1 main battle tank
 Leopard 2A4, a variant of the German Leopard 2 main battle tank

Computing 
 Apple A4, a microprocessor used in some Apple products
 AMD A4, a microprocessor
 Samsung Galaxy A04, a smartphone manufactured by Samsung Electronics

Other uses 
 A4 (classification), an amputee sport classification
 A4 or A4, the musical note La or A in the fourth octave
 A440 (pitch standard), the use of  the musical note A to reference musical pitch
 A04, Encyclopaedia of Chess Openings code for Réti Opening
 A4, a grade (climbing)
 A4, the code for permission to use specific land or premises for pubs and bars in town and country planning in the UK
 A4 Pod, a family of killer whales living in British Columbia coastal waters
 A4, a 1981 component for the Scourge of the Slave Lord adventure in the Dungeons and Dragons role playing game
 Biu-Mandara A.4 languages, a family of languages spoken in Cameroon and Nigeria
 Vlad A4, Belarusian YouTuber
 A4 Revolution, a name for the 2022 COVID-19 protests in China

See also 
 4A (disambiguation)
 A4A (disambiguation)
 AIV (disambiguation)